This is a list of articles in analytic philosophy.

 A. C. Grayling
 Actualism
 Alfred Jules Ayer
 Aloysius Martinich
 Analysis
 Analytic philosophy
 Analytic reasoning
 Analytic-synthetic distinction
 Arda Denkel
 Arthur Danto
 Australian Realism
 Avrum Stroll
 Begriffsschrift
 Berlin Circle
 Bernard Williams
 Bertrand Russell
 Brainstorms
 Breaking the Spell: Religion as a Natural Phenomenon
 C. D. Broad
 Cahiers pour l'Analyse
 Carl Gustav Hempel
 Charles Sanders Peirce
 Chinese room
 Cognitive synonymy
 Contemporary Pragmatism
 Contrast theory of meaning
 Cooperative principle
 Cora Diamond
 Daniel Dennett
 Darwin's Dangerous Idea
 David Braine (philosopher)
 David Kellogg Lewis
 Depiction
 Descriptivist theory of names
 Dialectica
 Direct reference theory
 Doctrine of internal relations
 Donald Davidson (philosopher)
 Doxastic logic
 Elbow Room (Dennett book)
 Elliott Sober
 Erkenntnis
 Ernst Mach
 Eternal statement
 F. C. S. Schiller
 Family resemblance
 Felicity conditions
 Form of life (philosophy)
 Frank P. Ramsey
 Freedom Evolves
 Friedrich Waismann
 G. E. M. Anscombe
 George Edward Moore
 Gilbert Ryle
 Gottlob Frege
 Gricean maxims
 Gustav Bergmann
 Hans Hahn
 Hans Reichenbach
 Hans Sluga
 Harvey Brown (philosopher)
 Herbert Feigl
 Holism
 Hypothetico-deductive model
 Indeterminacy of translation
 Introduction to Mathematical Philosophy
 Isaiah Berlin
 J. L. Austin
 Jeff Malpas
 Jerry Fodor
 John Hick
 John Rawls
 John Searle
 John Wisdom
 Jules Vuillemin
 Karl Menger
 Kit Fine
 Kurt Grelling
 Kwasi Wiredu
 Language, Truth, and Logic
 Logical atomism
 Logical form
 Logical positivism
 Lorenzo Peña
 Ludwig Wittgenstein
 Mark Addis
 Mark Sacks
 Max Black
 Mental representation
 Metaphor in philosophy
 Michael Dummett
 Michael Tye (philosopher)
 Modal realism
 Moritz Schlick
 Naming and Necessity
 Nelson Goodman
 Neurophilosophy
 Nonsense
 Norman Malcolm
 Oets Kolk Bouwsma
 Olaf Helmer
 Olga Hahn-Neurath
 On Certainty
 On Denoting
 Ordinary language philosophy
 Original proof of Gödel's completeness theorem
 Ostensive definition
 Otto Neurath
 P. F. Strawson
 Paradox of analysis
 Paul Churchland
 Paul Grice
 Per Martin-Löf
 Peter Hacker
 Peter Simons
 Philipp Frank
 Philippa Foot
 Philosophical analysis
 Philosophical Investigations
 Philosophy of engineering
 Philosophy of technology
 Pieranna Garavaso
 Postanalytic philosophy
 Preintuitionism
 Principia Ethica
 Principia Mathematica
 Private language argument
 Process philosophy
 Radical translation
 Ramsey sentence
 Richard von Mises
 Robert Audi
 Rose Rand
 Round square copula
 Rudolf Carnap
 Rupert Read
 Ryle's regress
 Speech act
 Stephen Laurence
 Susan Stebbing
 The Bounds of Sense
 The Logic of Scientific Discovery
 The Mind's I
 Theodore Drange
 Tore Nordenstam
 Tractatus Logico-Philosophicus
 Two Dogmas of Empiricism
 UCLA Department of Philosophy
 Use–mention distinction
 Verification theory
 Verificationism
 Victor Kraft
 Vienna Circle
 Wilfrid Sellars
 Willard Van Orman Quine
 William James Lectures
 William L. Rowe
 William W. Tait
 Wolfgang Stegmüller
 Word and Object
 Zeno Vendler
 Þorsteinn Gylfason

 
Analytic philosophy